The Panamerican Championship was an international football tournament held by the Panamerican Football Confederation every four years with three editions held from 1952 through 1960.

The competition was similar to the Copa América but included nations from the North American Football Confederation (NAFC) and the Confederación Centroamericana y del Caribe de Fútbol (CCCF) (which merged to form CONCACAF in 1961).

History 
The Panamerican Football Confederation was founded in 1946 to unify the three existing confederations, CONMEBOL, NAFC, and CCCF. The Panamerican Championship was organized by the new body, as an attempt to create an Americas-wide championship since the Americas' premier tournament, Copa América, was restricted to South American teams.

Nevertheless, starting in 1993, teams from CONCACAF (mostly Mexico with 10 participations) have participated in several editions of the Copa América by invitation. In addition, between 1996 and 2005, teams from CONMEBOL took part in the CONCACAF Gold Cup in order to help the competition establish itself, with Brazil and Colombia participating three times each.

Results

Performance by nation

All-time top scorers

See also
 Artemio Franchi Trophy
 AFC–OFC Challenge Cup
 Afro-Asian Cup of Nations
 Copa América Centenario

References 

 
Sports competitions in the Americas
Defunct international association football competitions in South America
Defunct international association football competitions in North America
International association football competitions in Central America
Recurring sporting events established in 1952
Recurring sporting events disestablished in 1960
1952 establishments in North America
1960 disestablishments in North America
1952 establishments in South America
1960 disestablishments in South America